Kemoh Sidiki Kamara (born 3 July 1995) is a Liberian footballer who plays for Barrack Young Controllers as a defender.

Career
Born in Lassaou, Guinea, Kamara has played for Barrack Young Controllers.

He made his international debut for Liberia in 2016.

References

1995 births
Living people
Liberian footballers
Liberia international footballers
Barrack Young Controllers FC players
Association football defenders